Stephen Warbeck (born 21 October 1953) is an English composer, best known for his film and television scores.

Warbeck was born in Southampton, Hampshire. He first became known for the music for Prime Suspect and won an Oscar for his score for Shakespeare in Love. He won the Drama Desk Award for Outstanding Music in a Play in 1994.

Warbeck attended Bristol University, and began his career as an actor. He plays the accordion and co-leads the group The hKippers (the 'h' is silent) with Paul Bradley.

In 2018, he directed his first feature film "The Thin Man" which has since been retitled The Man In The Hat  in France starring Ciarán Hinds and Stephen Dillane.

Film scores

Mrs. Brown (1997)
Shakespeare in Love (1998) (Academy Award)
The Duke (1998)
Mystery Men (1999)
A Christmas Carol (1999)
Billy Elliot (2000)
Quills (2000)
Captain Corelli's Mandolin (2001)
Charlotte Gray (2001)
Deseo (2002)
The Alzheimer Case (2003)
Love's Brother (2004)
Two Brothers (2004)
Oyster Farmer (2004)
Proof (2005)
Cargo (2006)
Alpha Male (2006)
Goal II: Living the Dream (2007)
Flawless (2007)The Other Man (2008)
 He Who Said No (2008)The Hessen Affair (2009)Princess Kaiulani (2010)Un balcon sur la mer (2010) There Be Dragons (2011)Polisse (2011)A Young Doctor's Notebook (2012)Des gens qui s'embrassent (2013)Hussein Who Said No (2014)Arctic Heart (2016)Hampstead (2017)The Children Act (2017)Making Noise Quietly (2019)My Family and the Wolf (2019)The Man In The Hat (2020)DNA (2020)

Awards and nominations
Academy Awards
Academy Award for Original Music Score-Best Original Musical or Comedy Score
 Won: Shakespeare in Love (1998)

BAFTA Awards
BAFTA Award for Best Film Music-Anthony Asquith Award for Film Music
 Nominated: Billy Elliot (2001)
 Nominated: Shakespeare in Love (1999)

BAFTA TV Award for Best Original Television Music
 Nominated: Screen Two  (TV)-For episode "Skallagrigg (#10.2) (1995)
 Nominated: Prime Suspect (TV) (1992)

BMI Film & TV Awards
BMI Film Music Award
 Won: Shakespeare in Love (1999)

Cannes International Film Festival Awards
Jury Prize for Feature Films
 Won: Polisse,directed by Maïwenn Le Besco, score by Stephen Warbeck (2011)

European Film Awards
Best Composer Award
 Nominated: De zaak Alzheimer (2004)

Ghent International Film Festival Awards
INTERNATIONAL COMPETITION 'THE IMPACT OF MUSIC ON FILM'-Georges Delerue Award for Best Music
 Won: Proof (2005)

Grammy Awards
Best Instrumental Composition Written for a Motion Picture, Television or Other Visual Media
 Nominated: Shakespeare in Love (1998)

Other
 Crystal Simorgh for The Day of Judgement (2008 film)''

References

External links

1953 births
Living people
musicians from Southampton
Alumni of the University of Bristol
Best Original Music Score Academy Award winners
English classical composers
English film score composers
English male film score composers
Georges Delerue Award winners
English male classical composers
English television composers
English male composers
Varèse Sarabande Records artists